The 5th César Awards ceremony, presented by the Académie des Arts et Techniques du Cinéma, honoured the best French films of 1979 and took place on 2 February 1980 at the Salle Pleyel in Paris. The ceremony was chaired by Jean Marais and hosted by Pierre Tchernia and Peter Ustinov. Tess won the award for Best Film.

Winners and nominees
The winners are highlighted in bold:

Best Film:Tess, directed by Roman PolanskiWomanlight directed by Costa GavrasDon Giovanni, directed by Joseph LoseyI... comme Icare, directed by Henri Verneuil
Best Foreign Film:Manhattan, directed by Woody AllenApocalypse Now, directed by Francis Ford CoppolaDie Blechtrommel, directed by Volker SchlöndorffHair, directed by Miloš Forman
Best Actor:Claude Brasseur, for The Police WarJean Rochefort, for Courage - Let's RunYves Montand, for I... comme IcarePatrick Dewaere, for Série noire
Best Actress:Miou-Miou, for La DérobadeRomy Schneider, for WomanlightDominique Laffin, for The Crying WomanNastassja Kinski, for Tess
Best Supporting Actor:Jean Bouise, for Coup de têteMichel Aumont, for Courage - Let's RunBernard Blier, for Série noireBernard Giraudeau, for Le Toubib
Best Supporting Actress:Nicole Garcia, for Le CavaleurDominique Lavanant, for Courage - Let's RunMaria Schneider, for La DérobadeMyriam Boyer, for Série noire
Best Director:Roman Polanski, for TessCosta Gavras, for WomanlightJoseph Losey, for Don GiovanniJacques Doillon, for La Drôlesse
Best Writing:Bertrand Blier, for Buffet froidJacques Doillon, for La DrôlesseHenri Verneuil, Didier Decoin, for I... comme IcareAlain Corneau, Georges Perec, for   Série noire
Best Cinematography:Ghislain Cloquet, for TessJean Penzer, for Buffet froidNéstor Almendros, for Perceval le GalloisBruno Nuytten, for Les Soeurs Brontë
Best Sound:Pierre Gamet, for WomanlightAlain Lachassagne, for Martin et LéaJean-Pierre Ruh, for Perceval le GalloisPierre Lenoir, for Retour à la bien-aimée
Best Editing:Reginald Beck, for Don GiovanniClaudine Merlin, for Buffet froidHenri Lanoë, for Le CavaleurClaudine Merlin, for Les Soeurs BrontëThierry Derocles, for Série noire
Best Music:Georges Delerue, for L'Amour en fuiteVladimir Cosma, for La DérobadeEnnio Morricone, for I... comme IcarePhilippe Sarde, for Tess
Best Production Design:Alexandre Trauner, for Don GiovanniThéobald Meurisse, for Buffet froidJacques Saulnier, for I... comme IcarePierre Guffroy, for Tess
Best Animated Short:Demain la petite fille sera en retard à l'école, directed by Michel BoschetBarbe bleue, directed by Olivier GillonLes Troubles fêtes, directed by Bernard Palacios
Best Fiction Short:Colloque de chiens, directed by Raúl RuizNuit feline, directed by Gérard MarxSibylle, directed by Robert Cappa
Best Documentary Short:Petit Pierre, directed by Emmanuel ClotGeorges Demeny, directed by Joël FargesPanoplie, directed by Philippe GaucherandLe Sculpteur parfait, directed by Rafi Toumayan
Honorary César:Pierre BraunbergerLouis de FunèsKirk Douglas

See also
 52nd Academy Awards
 33rd British Academy Film Awards

References

External links
 Official website
 
 5th César Awards at AlloCiné

1980
1980 film awards
Cesar